is a Japanese professional mixed martial artist.

Mixed martial arts career 
From 2004 to 2005 he went 1-2-2 but rebounded in 2006 with three consecutive wins over Ryuichi Miki, Mamoru Okochi and Takeshi Okada. His streak ended in September when he faced Masaaki Sugawara whom he lost to by majority decision. In early 2007 Shoujou started another winning streak with a second round knockout over Ayuma Shioda before defeating Masatoshi Abe and Junji Ikoma. He then fought Mamoru Yamaguchi to whom he dropped a unanimous decision. In his next fight, at Shooto Tradition 3, Shoujou got the biggest win of his career with a guillotine-choke submission over Yasuhiro Urushitani in the third round.

Title shot 
At Shooto Tradition 6 Shoujou fought Shinichi Kojima for the Shooto bantamweight title. The first round saw Shoujou being successful on the feet landing multiple kicks and combinations, while Kojima was the aggressor in the second after taking Shoujou down and landing multiple punches. The third round ended quick after Shoujou went for an unsuccessful double-leg takedown prompting Kojima to take his back where he choked him out with a rear naked choke after 0:39.

Mixed martial arts record

|-
|Loss
|align=center|14–9–2
|Ryuto Sawada
|KO (punches)
|Shooto - Gig Tokyo 18
|
|align=center|3
|align=center|0:16
|Tokyo, Japan
|
|-
|Win
|align=center|14–8–2
|Jun Nabeshima
|Decision (unanimous)
|Shooto - 7th Round 2014
|
|align=center|3
|align=center|5:00
|Tokyo, Japan
|
|-
|Loss
|align=center|13–8–2
|Yoshitaka Naito
|Decision (unanimous)
|Shooto - 2nd Round 2014
|
|align=center|3
|align=center|5:00
|Tokyo, Japan
|
|-
|Win
|align=center|13–7–2
|Tadaaki Yamamoto
|Decision (majority)
|Shooto - 12th Round
|
|align=center|3
|align=center|5:00
|Tokyo, Japan
|
|-
|Win
|align=center|12–7–2
|Hiroyuki Abe
|Decision (unanimous)
|Shooto - 8th Round
|
|align=center|3
|align=center|5:00
|Tokyo, Japan
|
|-
|Loss
|align=center|11–7–2
|Junji Ito
|Decision (majority)
|Shooto - 3rd Round
|
|align=center|3
|align=center|5:00
|Tokyo, Japan
|
|-
|Loss
|align=center|11–6–2
|Yasuhiro Urushitani
|TKO (head kick and punches)
|Shooto - Shootor's Legacy 3
|
|align=center|2
|align=center|0:24
|Tokyo, Japan
|
|-
|Win
|align=center|11–5–2
|Noboru Tahara
| Decision (unanimous) 
|Shooto - Shooto Tradition 2011
|
|align=center|3
|align=center|5:00
|Tokyo, Japan
|
|-
|Win
|align=center|10–5–2
|Jesse Taitano
| Decision (unanimous) 
|Shooto - The Way of Shooto 2: Like a Tiger, Like a Dragon
|
|align=center|3
|align=center|5:00
|Tokyo, Japan
|
|-
|Win
|align=center|9–5–2
|Junya Kodo
| Decision (majority) 
|Shooto - Revolutionary Exchanges 2 
|
|align=center|3
|align=center|5:00
|Tokyo, Japan
|
|- 
|Loss
|align=center|8–5–2
|Shinichi Kojima
| Submission (rear-naked choke) 
|Shooto - Shooto Tradition 6 
|
|align=center|3
|align=center|0:38
|Tokyo, Japan
|
|- 
|Win
|align=center|8–4–2
|Yasuhiro Urushitani
|Submission (guillotine choke)
|Shooto - Tradition 3 
|
|align=center|3
|align=center|3:39
|Tokyo, Japan
|
|- 
|Loss
|align=center|7–4–2
|Mamoru Yamaguchi
|Decision (unanimous) 
|Shooto - Shooting Disco 4: Born in the Fighting 
|
|align=center|3
|align=center|5:00
|Tokyo, Japan
|
|- 
| Win
|align=center|7–3–2
|Junji Ikoma
|Decision (unanimous)
|Shooto - Shooting Disco 3: Everybody Fights Now 
|
|align=center|2
|align=center|5:00
|Tokyo, Japan
|
|-
|Win
|align=center|6–3–2
|Masatoshi Abe
| Submission (guillotine choke) 
|Shooto - Back To Our Roots 4
|
|align=center|1
|align=center|1:38
|Yokohama, Japan
|
|- 
|Win
|align=center|5–3–2
|Ayumu Shioda
|KO (punches) 
| Shooto - It's Strong Being a Man
|
|align=center|2
|align=center|0:45
|Tokyo, Japan
|
|- 
|Loss
|align=center|4–3–2
|Masaaki Sugawara
|Decision (majority)
| Shooto - 11/10 in Korakuen Hall
|
|align=center|2
|align=center|5:00
|Tokyo, Japan
|
|-
|Win
|align=center|4–2–2
|Takeshi Okada
|Decision (unanimous) 
| Shooto 2006 - 9/8 in Korakuen Hall
|
|align=center|2
|align=center|5:00
|Tokyo, Japan
|
|- 
|Win
|align=center|3–2–2
|Mamoru Okochi
|Decision (unanimous) 
|Shooto 2006 - 5/28 in Kitazawa Town Hall
|
|align=center|2
|align=center|5:00
|Tokyo, Japan
|
|- 
|Win
|align=center|2–2–2
|Ryuichi Miki
|Decision (unanimous)
|Shooto - 3/3 in Kitazawa Town Hall
|
|align=center|2
|align=center|5:00
|Tokyo, Japan
|
|- 
|Loss
|align=center|1–2–2
|Yusei Shimokawa
|Decision (majority)
|Shooto 2005 - 11/6 in Korakuen Hall
|
|align=center|2
|align=center|5:00
|Tokyo, Japan
|
|- 
| Draw
|align=center|1–1–2
|Yutaka Tetsuka
|Draw
|Shooto - 9/23 in Korakuen Hall
|
|align=center|2
|align=center|5:00
|Tokyo, Japan
|
|-
| Win
|align=center|1–1–1
|Hiroharu Matsufuji
| Submission (rear-naked choke)
|Shooto - 5/29 in Kitazawa Town Hal
|
|align=center|2
|align=center|1:40
|Tokyo, Japan
|
|-
| Draw
|align=center|0–1–1
|Takehiko Hata
|Draw 
|GCM - CanD 
|
|align=center|2
|align=center|5:00
|Tokyo, Japan
|
|- 
|Loss
|align=center|0–1
|Junichi Sase
|Decision (unanimous)
|Shooto 2004- 1/24 in Korakuen Hall 
|
|align=center|2
|align=center|5:00
|Tokyo, Japan
|

References

External links

Living people
Japanese male mixed martial artists
Flyweight mixed martial artists
Strawweight mixed martial artists
Mixed martial artists utilizing Muay Thai
Japanese Muay Thai practitioners
1980 births